Dioxyna hyalina is a species of tephritid or fruit flies in the genus Dioxyna of the family Tephritidae.

Distribution
Australia.

References

Tephritinae
Diptera of Australasia
Insects described in 1996